Begegnungen II is a Sky Records 1985 compilation album (second volume to Begegnungen) with recordings by Brian Eno, Dieter Moebius, Hans-Joachim Roedelius, Conny Plank, Cluster, from solo albums, and from various collaborations between the artists.  All of the tracks had been previously released elsewhere.  The albums these tracks were drawn from are:  Material  by Moebius & Plank, Zero Set  by Moebius, Plank, Neumeier, Durch Die Wuste and Lustwandel, both Roedelius solo albums, After The Heat  by Eno, Moebius, Roedelius, Tonspuren,  the first solo album by Moebius,  Sowiesoso  by Cluster, and the eponymous Cluster & Eno.  These albums were released by Sky between 1976 and 1983.

The title is the German word for "Meetings" or "Encounters".

Begegnungen II was issued in the US on CD in 1996 by the Gyroscope label. It was also reissued on the San Francisco-based Water label in 2006.

Track listing
"Conditionierer" (Moebius & Plank) – 4:50
"Speed Display" (Moebius-Plank-Neumeier) – 5:14
"Mr. Livingstone" (Roedelius) – 5:41
"Broken Head" (Eno-Moebius-Roedelius) – 5:22
"Langer Atem" (Roedelius) – 7:14
"Hasenheide" (Dieter Moebius) – 2:39
"Es War Einmal" (Cluster) – 5:20
"Für Luise" (Cluster & Eno) – 5:01

Personnel
Brian Eno
Hans-Joachim Roedelius
Dieter Moebius
Conny Plank
Mani Neumeier – drums

References

External links

1985 compilation albums
Cluster (band) albums
Brian Eno compilation albums
Moebius & Plank albums
Hans-Joachim Roedelius albums